The Conanicut Battery is a colonial and 20th century military battery in Jamestown, Rhode Island, west of Beaver Tail Road.  The site offers a commanding view of the West Passage of Narragansett Bay.  

During the American Revolutionary War, local militia constructed an earthen battery on the site. The British occupied Jamestown later that year and took over the site, occupying the space until August 1778 when the French fleet arrived. The site is marked by a plaque placed by the Daughters of the American Revolution in 1931. During the early 20th century, the U.S. military built large partially underground defensive batteries in the area, notably Fort Getty and Fort Burnside.

The 22-acre site was added to the National Register of Historic Places in 1973.  It is now owned by the town and operated as Conanicut Battery National Historic Park. The Friends of Conanicut Battery and the Jamestown Historical Society are active in preserving the fort.

See also
National Register of Historic Places listings in Newport County, Rhode Island

References and external links

Conanicut Battery information Spring 2012 (PDF)
Conanicut Battery information Spring 2017 (PDF)
Conanicut Battery at Jamestown Historical Society
Conanicut Battery at American Forts Network
Conanicut Battery at FortWiki.com

Military facilities on the National Register of Historic Places in Rhode Island
Buildings and structures in Jamestown, Rhode Island
Parks in Rhode Island
Conanicut
Conanicut
Conanicut
Protected areas of Newport County, Rhode Island
National Register of Historic Places in Newport County, Rhode Island
American Revolution on the National Register of Historic Places